A bellows is a device for delivering pressurized air in a controlled quantity to a controlled location.

Bellows may also refer to:

Things
 Bellows (photography), accordion-like, pleated expandable part of a camera
 Metal bellows, elastic vessels that can be compressed when pressure is applied to the outside of the vessel
 Expansion joints
 Dr. Bellows, a fictional character from the sitcom series I Dream of Jeannie

Places
 Bellows Falls, Vermont
 Mount Bellows, mountain in Antarctica
 Bellows Air Force Station
 Neptune's Bellows, a channel on the southeast side of Deception Island, South Shetland Islands

People
 Bellows (surname)
Bellows (musician), American musician

See also 
 Bellow (disambiguation)